Team Virtu Cycling Women was a UCI Women's cycling team based in Denmark, that competed between 2015 and 2019.

Team history
In November 2016 it was announced that Bjarne Riis and Lars Seier (Riis-Seier Project) took over the women's team BMS BIRN and the men's team , with the latter being renamed Team VéloCONCEPT and the former becoming Team VéloCONCEPT Women for the 2017 season. After the addition of a new investor into the team in September 2017, Brøndby IF football team chairman Jan Beck Andersen, the cycling team's name changed to Team Virtu Cycling.

Final team roster

Major wins
2016
 Overall Tour de Feminin-O cenu Českého Švýcarska, Cecilie Uttrup Ludwig
 Youth classification, Cecilie Uttrup Ludwig
Stages 1 & 5, Cecilie Uttrup Ludwig
 Mountains classification Ladies Tour of Norway, Cecilie Uttrup Ludwig

2017
 Combativity classification, Stage 4 Holland Ladies Tour, Pernille Mathiesen

2018
Omloop Het Nieuwsblad, Christina Siggaard
 Sprints classification Emakumeen Euskal Bira, Katarzyna Pawłowska

2019
Omloop van het Hageland, Marta Bastianelli
Women's WorldTour Ronde van Drenthe, Marta Bastianelli
Tour of Flanders, Marta Bastianelli
Stage 2 Healthy Ageing Tour, Mieke Kröger
 Overall Gracia–Orlová, Marta Bastianelli
Stages 1 & 3, Marta Bastianelli
Stages 2a (ITT) & 4 Gracia–Orlová, Mieke Kröger
Stage 2b Gracia–Orlová, Rachel Neylan
 Sprints classification Thüringen Rundfahrt der Frauen, Barbara Guarischi
Stage 1, Barbara Guarischi
Stage 2, Marta Bastianelli
Postnord UCI WWT Vårgårda WestSweden Road Race, Marta Bastianelli
Stage 4 Tour Cycliste Féminin International de l'Ardèche, Anouska Koster
Stage 5 Tour Cycliste Féminin International de l'Ardèche, Marta Bastianelli

National and continental champions
2016
 Denmark Time Trial, Cecilie Uttrup Ludwig
 Denmark Junior Time Trial, Simone Eg

2017
 Israel Time Trial, Shani Bloch-Davidov
 USA Time Trial, Amber Neben
 Denmark Road Race, Camilla Møllebro
 Sweden Road Race, Sara Penton
  European U23 Time Trial, Pernille Mathiesen
  European U23 Road Race, Pernille Mathiesen

2019
 Denmark Time Trial, Louise Norman Hansen
 Italy Road Race, Marta Bastianelli

References

External links

UCI Women's Teams
2015 establishments in Denmark
Cycling teams established in 2015
Cycling teams based in Denmark
2019 disestablishments in Denmark
Cycling teams disestablished in 2019